Milan Řehoř is a former Czechoslovak slalom canoeist who competed in the 1950s. He won two gold medals in the C-2 team event at the ICF Canoe Slalom World Championships, earning them in 1955 and 1957.

References

External links 
 Milan REHOR at CanoeSlalom.net

Czechoslovak male canoeists
Living people
Year of birth missing (living people)
Medalists at the ICF Canoe Slalom World Championships